Chamaesphecia amygdaloidis is a moth of the family Sesiidae. It is found in Austria.

The larvae feed on Euphorbia austriaca and not Euphorbia amygdaloides as the species name implies.

References

Moths described in 1933
Sesiidae